Stephanie Anne Mills (born March 7, 1979) is a Canadian actress.

Biography
Born in Edmonton, Mills aspired to be a singer, dancer and actress as a young girl. In 2003, she had starred in Eloise at the Plaza with Julie Andrews.  She does voice work for Total Drama as Lindsay and Katie, 6teen as Kirsten, Sidekick as Vana Glama and Total Drama Presents: The Ridonculous Race as Kitty. She also has shown her acting roles in films and shows such as Rumours, The Safety of Objects, The Hoop Life, In Cold Blood and Gossip, among others.

Filmography

Film

Television

References

External links

1979 births
Living people
20th-century Canadian actresses
21st-century Canadian actresses
Actresses from Edmonton
Canadian film actresses
Canadian television actresses
Canadian voice actresses
Musicians from Edmonton
21st-century Canadian women singers